AC Bellinzona is a Swiss football club based in Bellinzona. It was founded in 1904, and won the Swiss Super League in 1948. After being folded in 2013 declaring bankruptcy, the team played the Ticino Group of 2.Liga, the sixth tier of the Swiss Football League System in 2014–15 season. After winning it and the 1. Liga Classic, Bellinzona is promoted to 1. Liga Promotion. They currently play in the Swiss Challenge League, the second tier of Swiss football.

History

Because Bellinzona is an Italian-speaking region, many of Italy's Serie A clubs have loaned youth players to the club to get first team experience.

Bellinzona was promoted to the Swiss Super League after beating St. Gallen 5–2 on aggregate in the relegation play-off following the 2007–2008 season. Bellinzona played at the top level in the 2008–2009 season for the first time since the 1989–90 season.  As finalists in the Swiss Cup, the team also qualified for the 08-09 UEFA Cup where it beat Ararat Yerevan of Armenia in the 1st qualifying round. Then they knocked-out Ukrainian FC Dnipro on away goal rule (2:3 in Dnipropetrovsk, and 2:1 home victory, 4:4 aggregate).  In third qualifying round they faced Galatasaray losing both games 3:4 at home ground and 1:2 in Istanbul.

In 2013 before the 2013–14 season of 1. Liga Promotion the club was declared bankrupt. After staying one season playing only at young divisions, the club went back to professional football, joining the 2014–15 2.Liga.
After two years in 1. Liga Classic, the club finished first in 2018 and was promoted to the 1. Liga Promotion for the 2018–19 season. 

In the 2021-22 Swiss Promotion League, Bellinzona reached second place during the regular season. In the promotion round, they were able eke out a first place finish ahead of FC Breitenrain to gain promotion to the Swiss Challenge League. As Breitenrain withdrew their license request, Bellinzona would have been promoted even had they not won the season.

Honours 
Swiss Super League
 Champions: 1947–48

Swiss Challenge League
 Champions: 1942–43 (Lost promotion play-off), 1943–44 (Won pronotion play-off), 1975–76, 1979–80, 1999–2000 (Lost promotion play-off)

Swiss Promotion League
Champions: 2021–22

1. Liga Classic
 Champions: 1931–32, 1935–36, 1998–99, 2017–18

2. Liga
 Champions: 1920–21 (as 4th tier), 2014–15 (as 6th tier)

Players

Current squad
As of 27 January 2023.

Out on loan

Coaching staff

References

External links
Official website 
http://www.calcioregionale.ch/?1298/2a-lega
https://web.archive.org/web/20140908031642/http://www.acbellinzona.ch/index.php/squadre

 
Football clubs in Switzerland
AC Bellinzona
AC Bellinzona
Association football clubs established in 1904
1904 establishments in Switzerland
Organisations based in Bellinzona